Helsinki Velodrome is an outdoor velodrome, American football and field hockey stadium in Helsinki, Finland. The protected functionalist concrete building was designed by Hilding Ekelund.

History 
It was built in 1938–1940 for the 1940 Summer Olympics which were cancelled due to World War II. After the war, it was a venue of the 1952 Summer Olympics for the track cycling and field hockey events. The Velodrome hosted the four-track cycling events and the whole field hockey event for the Olympics. The original building was deemed inadequate during the games and additional space was quickly erected to accommodate the athletes and press. Some temporary seating was also constructed for additional capacity.

Before the renovation of 1997–2000, the center area had a natural grass pitch and was used for soccer, hosting local teams like Ponnistus, Käpylän Pallo and Atlantis FC.

Docomomo has listed it as a significant example of modern architecture in Finland.

Usage

Cycling 
The cycling track is 400 meters in length and is used for most national events. The banking in the bends is 37.5˚ and 16˚ on the straights. The length of the track and the lack of built safety measures make the track unsuitable for international cycling competitions.

Helsinki Velodrome also acts as a starting and ending point for the annual cyclosportive Tour de Helsinki.

American football 
The Helsinki Velodrome is the home field of most American football teams in Helsinki, including East City Giants and the Vaahteraliiga teams Helsinki Roosters and Helsinki Wolverines. The ground also caters to lacrosse and field hockey players.

In 2010 a training pitch designated primarily for American football was opened in the near vicinity of the Helsinki Velodrome, making the area an unofficial American football center of Helsinki.

Field hockey
During the summer season the field is used for playing field hockey.

References

Football venues in Finland
Velodromes in Finland
Venues of the 1952 Summer Olympics
Cycle racing in Finland
Olympic cycling venues
Olympic field hockey venues
Hilding Ekelund buildings
American football venues in Finland
Pasila
1941 establishments in Finland
Sports venues completed in 1941
Lacrosse venues
Field hockey venues